The Kyle Unit (or Kyle Correctional Center) is a private state prison for men located in Kyle, Hays County, Texas, which is operated by Management and Training Corporation under contract with the Texas Department of Criminal Justice.  

This facility was opened in June 1989, and a maximum capacity of 520 prisoners in special therapeutic and substance abuse programs.

References

Prisons in Texas
Buildings and structures in Hays County, Texas
Management and Training Corporation
1989 establishments in Texas